The D. António Francisco dos Santos Bridge is a proposed bridge that will span the River Douro between the cities of Porto and Vila Nova de Gaia in Portugal. Following a meeting between Porto and Vila Nova de Gaia councils, it was agreed in 2018 to build a seventh bridge over the Douro river and name it after the former bishop of Porto António Francisco dos Santos.

Notes

Bridges in Porto
Bridges over the Douro River
Unbuilt buildings and structures in Portugal